Brook is a small medieval hamlet situated 1–2 miles south of the village of King's Somborne in the Test Valley, Hampshire.

Brook features on a number of mediaeval maps of Hampshire and England, and has a significant population until the 17th century, when the population was decimated by the plague.

The most significant building in Brook today is Brook Farm House, an 18th-century farmhouse which may have been the manor house of the village. It is a Grade II listed building.

References

Villages in Hampshire
Test Valley